Inter Shibuya – La Mafia (stylized in all caps) is the fourth studio album by Colombian singer Feid, released on August 20, 2021, through Universal Music Latino. It was produced by Sky Rompiendo, Jowan, Taiko, ICON, Foreign Teck, BassCharity, Pardo, Alex Petit and Feid himself, Sky Rompiendo and ICON also appear as guest artists. A special edition of the album was released on December 17, 2021, titled Inter Shibuya (Ferxxo Edition), containing nine more songs including collaborations with Karol G, Ryan Castro, The Rudeboyz, Eladio Carrión, Mora and Sael.

The album peaked at numbers 29 and 20 at the Top Latin Albums and Latin Rhythm Albums charts, respectively, being his first and only appearance in the latter chart. It also peaked at number 18 at the Spanish Albums chart, while the special edition peaked at 21. The album won Album of the Year – New Artist at the 2022 Premios Tu Música Urbano.

Background
The album was produced during the COVID-19 pandemic and was recorded in both Medellin, Colombia and Miami, United States. It was mostly produced by Colombian record producer Sky Rompiendo, who had previously worked on several occasions with Feid, including his first song "Morena", released in 2016. On August 2, 2021, Feid announced the date release of the album via his Instagram account, he also shared its cover, title, tracklist and producers for each song, the tracklist included a bonus track as the fifteenth song in the album which later was announced to be "Si Tú Supieras" after being chosen by his fans. The title derives from the street ward of Shibuya in Tokyo and comes from the Feid's admiration of Japanese culture, he said that "for me, the intersection represents a meeting point and this is a way to say that I want a lot of people to get drawn to my album". The album cover shows four intersecting circles in the CMYK color model, each representing one of his four studio albums, it was designed by his sister and painted by his father.

Inter Shibuya was inspired by the reggaeton songs from the early 2000s that got Feid into the genre, he said that "beyond a tribute, I wanted to find my space in reggaeton, give myself my place. I had always thought, how do I live like a classic? How do I live in that moment? Because what made me fall in love with reggaeton is not what it sounds like now, what (sounds) now is the music of my generation, which is super cool. But what made me fall in love with reggaeton was Baila Morena by Héctor & Tito; Motivando a la Yal, the Zion & Lennox album; Barrio Fino, Daddy Yankee's album", he continued by saying that "I wanted to make, in this album in particular, a journey through the types of reggaeton songs that I personally liked to listen to when I was a big fan and deeply into reggaeton".

To promote the album and its special edition, Feid embarked on the tour VACAXIONES con el Ferxxo which spanned through several cities in Colombia such as Bogotá and Cali, the tour started on December 3, 2021, with a concert in Villavicencio.

Singles
The album spawned five singles, one released in 2020, "Chimbita" featuring Colombian producer Sky Rompiendo on December 11, and the other four in 2021, "14 de Febrero" on February 12, "Purrito Apa" on April 2, "Fumeteo" on June 10 and "Tengo Fe" on July 23. The special edition of the album was promoted with four singles, all of them released through 2021, "Vacaxiones" on October 29, "Monastery" featuring Ryan Castro on November 12, "Fumeteo (Remix)" featuring Mora and Eladio Carrión on November 26 and "Friki" featuring Karol G on December 10. 

Despite "Friki" being the only single to chart in an American chart, peaking at number 34 at the Hot Latin Songs chart, all singles expect "14 de Febrero", "Monastery" and the remix of "Fumeteo" received certifications in United States, platinum for "Vacaxiones", "Fumeteo", "Chimbita" and "Friki", and gold for "Tengo Fe" and "Purrito Apa", the songs "Amor de Mi Vida" and "Si Tú Supieras" were also certified in the country, gold for the former and platinum for the latter. Additionally, three of the singles were certified in Mexico in 2022, platinum for "Monastery" and "Friki", and gold for "Chimbita". 

Following the release of Inter Shibuya – La Mafia, all of its tracks appeared on the Top 200 most streamed songs in Spotify Colombia while the album appeared at the fifth position in the Top 10 Global Album Debuts of Spotify.

Track listing 

Notes
All tracks are stylized in all caps; except "14 de Febrero" and "Monastery".

Charts

Weekly charts

Year-end charts

Certifications

References

2021 albums